Rasbora aprotaenia is a species of cyprinid fish in the genus Rasbora. It is found in northern Java.

References 

Rasboras
Freshwater fish of Java
Endemic fauna of Java
Fish described in 1954
Taxa named by Carl Leavitt Hubbs
Taxa named by Martin Ralph Brittan